Marcus Whitman is a bronze sculpture depicting the American physician of the same name by Avard Fairbanks, installed in the United States Capitol's National Statuary Hall, in Washington, D.C., as part of the National Statuary Hall Collection. The statue was donated by the U.S. state of Washington in 1953.

References

External links
 

1953 establishments in Washington, D.C.
Bronze sculptures in Washington, D.C.
Whitman, Marcus
Sculptures by Avard Fairbanks
Sculptures of men in Washington, D.C.